Urqipi (Aymara urqu male, ipi a small wild potato, also spelled Orkhepi) is a  mountain in the Andes of Bolivia. It lies in the La Paz Department, Pacajes Province, Calacoto Municipality, north of the Anallajsi volcano. It is located at the Achuta River, north-east of the mountain Pukara and north of the mountain Churi Willk'i.

See also 
 Pichaqa

References 

Mountains of La Paz Department (Bolivia)